Condamine Plains is a rural locality in the Toowoomba Region, Queensland, Australia.

History 
The locality takes its name from the pastoral station in the district.

Road infrastructure
The Pampas-Horrane Road (State Route 82) runs through from north to south.

References 

Toowoomba Region
Localities in Queensland